Nationality words link to articles with information on the nation's poetry or literature (for instance, Irish or France).

Events
The Duke de Medinaceli forces Spanish poet Francisco de Quevedo into a 3-month marriage with Doña Esperanza de Aragón.

Works published

Great Britain
 Richard Brathwaite, Anniversaries upon his Panarete, anonymously published (see also Anniversaries [...] Continued 1635)
 Richard Crashaw, Epigrammatum Sacrorum Liber, anonymously published
 William Habington, Castara, anonymously published
 Alexander Ross, Virgilii Evangelisantis Christiados, cento
 Alice Sutcliffe, Meditations of Man's Mortalitie: or, A Way to True Blessednesse, in prose and verse

Other
 Marie de Gournay, also known as Marie le Jars, demoiselle de Gournay, Les Avis et presents, including a feminist tract, translations, moral essays and verse (revised from the original version, Ombre 1626; again revised 1641), France
 Lope de Vega, Spain, La Gatomaquia ("The Catfight"), a mock epic, and Rimas humanas y divinas del licenciado Tomé de Burguillos
 Johannes Narssius, Gustavidos liber quartus

Births
Death years link to the corresponding "[year] in poetry" article:
 January 16 - Dorothe Engelbretsdotter (died 1716), Norwegian poet
 December 15 - Thomas Kingo (died 1703), Danish bishop, poet and hymn-writer

Deaths
Birth years link to the corresponding "[year] in poetry" article:
 May 12 - George Chapman (born 1559), English dramatist, translator and poet
 June 25 - John Marston (born 1576), English dramatist, poet and satirist
 August 23 (bur.) - Tomos Prys (born c. 1564), Welsh-language poet 
 Adriano Banchieri (born 1568), Italian composer, music theorist, organist and poet

See also

 Poetry
 17th century in poetry
 17th century in literature

Notes

17th-century poetry
Poetry